Ascend Federal Credit Union (or Ascend; formerly  AEDC Federal Credit Union) is a federally chartered credit union based in Tullahoma, Tennessee. Ascend is regulated and insured through the National Credit Union Administration (NCUA).

Ascend has over 208,000 members and $2.6 billion USD in assets.

The company has locations in 21 Middle Tennessee counties.

History
Ascend Federal Credit Union was chartered on July 12, 1951 in order to serve employees of the Arnold Air Force Base.

In 2006, the company changed its name from AEDC Federal Credit Union to Ascend Federal Credit Union. 
 
In 2015, Ascend signed a 10-year contract with Live Nation for the naming rights of the Ascend Amphitheater.

In  2018, the firm started leveraging its LenderAssis LOS platform and DecisionAssis product.

In 2019, the company was announced to turn as an Episys platform.

Management 
Caren Gabriel is a CEO. She is a member of leadership board in CUNA Mutual Group as well.

Social activity 
In 2020, Ascend FCU made a donation of $10,000 to LLS’s Children’s Initiative.

In 2021, the company supported the American Heart Association (AHA’s), raising $1,150, in order to deepen people's knowledge about women's health.

This year, Ascend contributed $50,000 to Monroe Carell Jr. Children’s Hospital at Vanderbilt.

In May, 2021, the firm gave a financial support to the 6th Annual Hometown Heroes Walk for Children.

Awards 
In April, 2021, Ascend Federal Credit Union received two CUNA Diamond Awards for Excellence in Email and Video Marketing.

References

External links
 Official website

Credit unions based in Tennessee
Banks established in 1951
Companies based in Tennessee
Tullahoma, Tennessee micropolitan area
1951 establishments in Tennessee